Kommuri may refer to:

 Kommuri Sambasiva Rao (born 1926), writer from Andhra Pradesh, famous for detective novels
 Kommuri Venugopala Rao (born 1935), writer from Andhra Pradesh